Ron Ng Cheuk-hei (born 2 September 1979) is a Hong Kong actor, singer, and former dancer. He first rose to popularity in the 2003 TVB drama Triumph in the Skies. He has since starred in several successful television series, most notably Twin of Brothers, The Academy series, and the Flying Tiger franchise. He is known for his various police roles in dramas series.

Ng has also appeared in the films Bleeding Mountain (2012), Shock Wave (2017), and Bodies at Rest (2019).

Early life and career beginnings
Ng was born on 2 September 1979 in Hong Kong. He has an older sister. In 1999, he enrolled into Hong Kong broadcasting station TVB's dance training course. Under the recommendation of actor Louis Koo (for whom Ng appeared as a background dancer for), Ng joined TVB as an actor after graduating from the station's acting classes. He began his career with minor roles, such as in Burning Flame II.

Career

As actor
In 2003, Ng was cast in a lead role in the historical custome drama Find the Light, starring alongside Damian Lau and Bosco Wong. That same year, Ng's breakthrough role came in the role of pilot trainee Issac Tong in the highly acclaimed Triumph in the Skies. Ng won TVB's Most Improved Actor Award in 2004 for his performance in the drama Twin of Brothers at the 37th TVB Anniversary Awards. Since then, Ng had been highly promoted at TVB, being cast as the male lead in most dramas. Ng was voted Super Idol by TVB Weekly and My Favorite TV character in Astro Wah Lai Toi TV Awards in 2005.

In 2005, he portrayed the strong-willed Cheung Lap-Man in The Academy, a drama about police training. The drama was renewed for two more installments, On the First Beat (2007) and E.U. (2009), in which Ng reprised his role. Ng appeared in the movie Moments of Love in 2005, marking his film debut.

In 2007, Ng began filming television dramas in mainland China. He starred in Deep Affection Life, and in Pretty Maid (2008), for which he won the CTV Award for Best Actor.

In 2009 Ng starred in the time travelling comedy A Chip Off the Old Block. He portrayed Chiang Bit-ching in the critically acclaimed period drama Rosy Business, for which he was nominated for Best Supporting Actor at the 2009 TVB Anniversary Awards. In the same year, Ng made a cameo appearance in the E.U. spin-off movie Turning Point. In January 2010, he began filming for the drama Wax and Wane. Ng noted that he had turned down two mainland drama offers in order to film Wax and Wane, also stating that it was worth it to film alongside Roger Kwok, who stars as drama's main lead. In October 2010, he was cast in the drama L'Escargot, which aired in January 2012.

Ng starred in the 2011 comedy drama Yes, Sir. Sorry Sir!, starring alongside Moses Chan, Tavia Yeung, and Linda Chung. Ng portrayed Inspector Ching Man-lik in the drama. That year he also starred in police procedural drama Forensic Heroes III, which he filmed at the beginning of the year. In May 2011, Ng was cast as Chong Yau Kit, a paramilitary officer, in the action crime drama Ruse of Engagement (previously known as ATF), starring alongside Ruco Chan and Aimee Chan. The drama was not aired until 17 March 2014.

In 2013, Ng reprised his role as Issac Tong in Triumph in the Skies II. In November 2013, Ng began filming for comedy costume drama Lady Sour, starring opposite Myolie Wu. The drama aired in December 2014. In 2014, Ng starred in Black Heart White Soul as a police officer. In 2015, after 17 years at TVB, Ng decided to not renew his management contract with TVB, hoping to have more opportunities outside of Hong Kong. His last TVB drama was Lord of Shanghai, in which Ng portrays a cunning lawyer. At the 17th Huading Awards, Ng was awarded Audience's Favorite Artist (全國觀眾最喜愛的影視明星).

In 2017, Ng took on the role of Senior Inspector, Ko Ka-chun (高家俊), in Shaw Brother's action crime television drama Flying Tiger. He also took part in the action film Shock Wave and the action thriller Bodies at Rest. In 2018, Ng starred in the drama The Lady in the Cubicle. In 2019, Ng starred in Flying Tiger 2 as Senior Inspector Cheung Man-lung, who is part of the secret A Team. The drama marks the first time since 2003's Triumph in the Skies that Ng, Bosco Wong, and Kenneth Ma appeared in a drama together. Ng portrays Cheng Tian in the 2020 web television series White War.

Ng appeared in the 2020 film Shock Wave 2. Ng has also guest-starred in the hit series Line Walker: Bull Fight in episode 27. It was confirmed that Ng will be filming for the third installment of Flying Tiger in July 2020. Flying Tiger 3 premiered in December 2021 on the Chinese streaming platform Youku.

Music
In 2005, Ng signed with BMA Music Records and released his first EP The Fast Pass in December. Its lead single "Don't Blame Her" 別怪她 is part of the soundtrack in the drama series Revolving Doors of Vengeance. Ng was awarded the Best Newcomer Silver Award at the Jade Solid Gold Awards in 2005. In January 2006, Ng released his first studio album Fast Forward and headlined a concert.

Ng has sung several theme songs for the television dramas he starred in, including "Red Butterfly" 紅蝴蝶 for Rosy Business in 2009.

On 22 May 2010, Ng, Bosco Wong, Kevin Cheng, and Moses Chan hosted a concert at Arena of Stars called "Men's Live in Genting" in Genting, Malaysia. In August 2016, Ng, along with Ruco Chan, Tavia Yeung, and Nancy Wu performed at Be Charmed 2 (雲頂綻放魅力2演唱會).

In 2022, Ng joined the cast of reality tv show Call Me by Fire (season 2) as a contestant.

Filmography

Film

Television

Variety show

Discography
Fighter (TVB Series "The Academy" Theme) – Ron Ng, Sky, Zac Kao and Rico Kwok
King Kong (TVB Series "Men in Pain" Sub Theme) – Ron Ng
Love Test (Radio Drama "28th Floor Love Story" Theme) – Ron Ng and Tavia Yeung
Wedding Dress/Marriage Garments (TVB Series "Lost in the Chamber of Love" Theme) – Ron Ng and Myolie Wu
Put Your Hands Up ("2006 World Cup Theme") – Ron Ng, Raymond Lam, Bosco Wong and Kevin Cheng
Sun's Hand (Japanese Cartoon "Japanese Bread King" Theme) – Ron Ng
Breakthrough (TVB Series "The Brink of Law" Theme) – Ron Ng and Steven Ma
Yue Kerng Yuet Yung ("2004 Olympics Theme") – Ron Ng, Raymond Lam, Bosco Wong, Sammul Chan, Lai Lok Yi, and Kenneth Ma
Ultimate Battle (Japanese cartoon Pokémon Theme) – Ron Ng
Don't Blame Her (TVB Series "Revolving Doors Of Vengeance" sub theme) – Ron Ng
Step Towards The Sky in Your Dreams (TVB Series "On The First Beat" theme) – Ron Ng, Kenny Kwan and Deep Ng
Storm (TVB Series "The Four" Theme Song) – Ron Ng, Raymond Lam, Sammul Chan, Kenneth Ma (2008)
Black and White Variation (TVB Series "E.U." Theme Song) – Ron Ng, Sammul Chan, Michael Tse (2009)
Red Butterfly (TVB Series "Rosy Business" Theme Song) – Ron Ng (2009)
A Thousand Lifetimes (Korean dubbed Tai Chi Chasers/太極千字文 Theme) – Ron Ng (2009)
Don't Say That I Didn't Indulge You (咪話唔就你) (A Chip Off the Old Block, opening theme) – Ron Ng and Myolie Wu (2009)
OL Supreme (女王辦公室) Theme Song – Ron Ng, Champman To and Denise Ho (2010)
Reunion (團圓) (Wax and Wane, opening/ending theme) – Ron Ng (2011)
春風化雨 ( Yes Sir Sorry Sir(點解阿Sir係阿Sir) Theme Song – Ron Ng and Moses Chan (2011)
Target (目擊) (法證先鋒III Theme Song) – Ron Ng and Wayne Lai (2011)
A Tale of a Wounded City (傷城記)(缺宅男女 Theme Song) – Ron Ng and Linda Chung (2012)
Sometimes (TVB Series "Silver Spoon, Sterling Shackles" ending theme) – Ron Ng (2012)
Although This World (雖然這個世界) (Flying Tiger 飛虎之潛行極戰 Sub Theme) – Ron Ng and Bosco Wong (2018)

Awards and nominations

2003
Metro ShowBiz TV Awardsb – Most Popular Male Actor
Yahoo Popularity Awards – Most Searched Rising-Popularity Artiste
Shanghai TV Festival – Most Potential Actor
2004
Next Television Award – The Most "Bright Future" Male Actor
Next Television Award – The Most Outstanding Style New Actor
The Most Healthy Appearance Award – Top Ten Healthiest Artiste
The Most Healthy Appearance Award – Armani Active Award
Guardian's Number One Most Healthy Award – Charming Award
TVB Anniversary Awards (2004) – Most Improved Actor
2005
Next Television Award' – Top Ten Artiste Number 10
TVB Weekly Magazine Most Popular Idol Award – Most Popular Idol (Male)
TVB Weekly Magazine Most Popular Idol Award – Most Popular Ancient Times Character Award (Male)
Jade Solid Gold Second round – Newcomer Award
Yahoo! Most Searched Artistes Award – Yahoo! Most Searched Television Male Artiste
Metroshowbiz Hit Awards – Hit Awards 2005 Karaoke Song
2005 Children's Song Awards – Top Ten Children's Songs
2005 Jade Solid Gold Top 10 Awards – The most popular new male artist
2006
TVB Anniversary Awards (2006) – Best Actor (nominated)
TVB Anniversary Awards (2006) – My Favorite Male Character (nominated)
Astro Wah Lai Toi 2005 Television Awards Ceremony (Malaysia) – My Favorite Character Award
Jade Solid Gold Top 10 Awards – Favorite Newcomer Male Award
Hits Television Drama Awards – Popular Television Artiste
Ultimate Song King (GuangZhou) – Most Potential Newcomer (Hong Kong)
TV Series Themes Awards (Beijing) – Most Potential Artiste in Hong Kong Vicinity
Lui Ting 881 Who Can Stand Against Me – Beautiful Voice Daddy
Lui Ting 881 Who Can Stand Against Me – Most Potential Artiste
Awards – Happy Shop Most Energetic Artiste
TVB Children's Songs Award – Ten Best Songs for "Ultimate Battle"
2007
TVB Anniversary Awards (2007) – Best Actor (nominated)
TVB Anniversary Awards (2007) – My Favorite Male Character (nominated)
TVB Anniversary Awards (2007) – Mainland Most Popular TVB Male Artist
Astro Wah Lai Toi 2006 Television Awards Ceremony (Malaysia) – My Favorite Character Award
Hong Kong's Future Big-Time Celebrity 2006 (GuangZhou) – Hong Kong Future Big-Time Celebrity
Hong Kong's Future Big-Time Celebrity 2006 (GuangZhou) – Most Popular Artiste
9+2音樂先鋒榜 – Best Male Actor-Singer Award – Best Male Actor-Singer Award
Metro ShowBiz TV Awards – Most Popular Male Actor
Next Magazine TV Awards – Top Ten TV Artistes
2008
TVB Anniversary Awards (2008) – My Favorite Male Character (nominated)
TVB Anniversary Awards (2008) – Favourite Actor (in Mainland China) (nominated)
TVB Anniversary Awards (2008) – TVB Long Term Service and Outstanding Staff Award
Three Weekly – Favourite Character
Fung Yan Award (China) – "Potential Star"
Fung Yan Award (China) – Favourite Character
Singapore Entertainment Awards – My Most Favourite Hong Kong Drama Series Actor
QQ Entertainment Award – Favorite Hong Kong TV Actor
Singapore Entertainment Awards – OMY Web Hottest Celeb
Yahoo Popularity Awards
2009
TVB Anniversary Awards (2009) – Best Supporting Actor (nominated)
TVB Anniversary Awards (2009) – TVB.com Popular Artist (nominated)
Next Magazine TV Artists Award – Top Ten TV Artistes
China Fashion Carnival – Most Fashionable Artiste
Sohu.com – 50 Most Beautiful Person on Earth
HIM Magazine Awards – Cover Award
Esquire Magazine Awards – Most Promising Star
Children's Song Awards – Top Ten Children's Songs
Yahoo! Buzz Award – Most Popular TV Male Artist
2011
TVB Anniversary Awards – Best Actor (nominated)

References

External links
Official TVB Blog of Ron Ng

Hong Kong male film actors
1979 births
Living people
Hong Kong male television actors
Hong Kong male singers
TVB actors
20th-century Hong Kong male actors
21st-century Hong Kong male actors